Ozurgeti (Ozurgetis munitsipalit'et'i) is a municipality of Georgia, in the region of Guria. Its main town is Ozurgeti.

Ozurgeti municipality is located on the territory of western Georgia. Ozurgeti municipality is bordered on the west by the Black Sea, on the south by the Adjara-Guria ridge, the Choloki River and the Autonomous Republic of Adjara; Chokhatauri municipalities in the east and Lanchkhuti municipalities in the north. Black earth-alluvial and earthen soils are spread in the territory of the municipality. Red earth soils are spread in the hilly strip of the municipality. Red alloys of alluvial secondary origin are developed on the terraces of rivers, sediments, and swamps, and swampy soils are developed in the coastal zone.

History
Until 1917, the territory of the municipality was included in Ozurgeti Mazra of Kutaisi Province, in 1930 it was formed as a separate territorial unit and was called Ozurgeti District. In 1934, the Makharadze district was renamed in honor of Philip Makharadze. In the early 1960s, the area of the district was reduced: part of the area near Gomismti was transferred to Kobuleti district, and part of the area around the river Supsa to Lanchkhuti district. In 1963–64, Chokhatauri district joined Makharadze district and the city of Makharadze was defined as the center. In 1990, the district was renamed Ozurgeti, and since 2006 - Ozurgeti Municipality. Between 2014 and 2017 the city of Ozurgeti, like others, was separated from the municipality and was a so-called "self-governed" city (or kalaki).

Geography 
The territory of the municipality is flooded with rivers and valleys, the rivers belong to the Black Sea basin. The river Supsa flows in the territory of the municipality, to which the river Bakhvistskali joins the territory of the municipality. Also important are the sediments with tributaries: Bzhuzhi, Choloki, Bogila, and others. The rivers of the municipality are fed by lanyards, rains, soil water, and springs. At the confluence of the seas, they contribute to the marshes of the lowlands. The river Choloki separates Ozurgeti municipality from the territory of Kobuleti municipality. The rivers are rich in fish. Found in trout, barbel, salmon, sorrel. The highest points of the territory of the municipality are in the south-eastern part of its border. Here are the highest peaks of the municipality: Mount Sakornia (.) And Gunistavi.

Climate 
The climate is characterized by a subtropical humid climate. Humidity is due to the proximity of the Black Sea and high ridges to the east. Humidity is especially high in summer. The maximum precipitation falls in September, the minimum - in May. The absolute maximum ranges between 31 and 41 °C. The territory of the municipality is characterized by seasonal winds: south-east winds in winter and west winds in summer. Knows fions in winter and spring, though they do less harm; Than in other parts of western Georgia. The territory of the municipality is in the 5-6 magnitude zone in terms of earthquake danger.

Biodiversity

The forest occupies  on the territory of the municipality. The vegetation is formed by chestnut, hornbeam, beech, dried fruit, in the form of undergrowth can be found blueberries, sage, watercress. Natural forests are preserved in the south-eastern highlands of the municipality. Bears, roe deer, marten, tortoises, lynxes, squirrels, wolves, ticks, hedgehogs, badgers, rabbits, rabbits are common in the forests. Among the birds common are dzera, kvavi, orbi, thrush, chkhartvi, wild duck, swamp hen, niblia, kodala, tavshava, heartworm, hawk. Migratory birds enter in spring: ghazo, jadon, quail, hoopoe, mullet.

Politics
Ozurgeti Municipal Assembly (Georgian: ოზურგეთის საკრებულო, Ozurgeti Sakrebulo) is a representative body in Ozurgeti Municipality, consisting of 45 members and elected every four years. The last election was held in October 2021.

Population

By the start of 2021 the population was determined at 59,357 people, a decline compared to the 2014 census. There are 75 settlements in the municipality: 1 city, 4 urban-type settlements (daba) and 70 villages.

97% of the residents are Georgians, mainly Gurians, as well as Adjarans. There are also Armenians (2%) and Russians (1%). The vast majority of the population is Orthodox Christian, a small portion is Muslim, and there are small groups of other religious denominations living in the municipality, such as Catholics, Protestants and Jehovah's Witnesses.

Historical sites

The oldest historical monument on the territory of the municipality is the town of Vashnari.
There are two castles on the territory of the municipality and both are named after Queen Tamar. These are the castles of Askani and Likhauri. Askani Castle Among the medieval church buildings are the Church of the Creator, which is the center of the Diocese of the Creator, and the Church of Jumat, which was the historic center of the Diocese of Jumat. Important monuments are the churches of Achi, Likhauri, and Baileti, where rare frescoes are preserved. In addition, hall and basilica type churches are located in Dvabzu, Vaniskedi, Kviriketi, Meria, Mtispiri, Konchkati and Khrialeti.

Historical sites include:
 Achi Monastery
 Jumati monastery
 Likhauri Church
 Shemokmedi Monastery

Resorts and tourism

Ozurgeti Municipality has unique resorts both on the seaside and in the alpine zone. Of the four recreational status resorts in Georgia, Ureki is located in the municipality. The resorts of the municipality allow to host tourists from Georgia or abroad in winter and summer, which is one of the main preconditions for budget growth and employment of the population. Ureki, Shekvetili and Gomismta mountain resort are among the seaside resorts of the municipality.

Resorts and Tourist sites include:

Ureki
Shekvetili
Nasakirali
Black Sea Arena
Ozurgeti Drama Theatre
Ozurgeti History Museum
Shekvetili Miniature Park
Dimitri Gurieli Palace

Twin towns – sister cities
 Boyarka, Ukraine 
 Rokiškis, Lithuania

See also
 List of municipalities in Georgia (country)
 Chanieturi, a village within Ozurgeti
 Gaghma Dvabzu, a village within Ozurgeti
 Vashtiali, a village within Ozurgeti

References

External links
 Districts of Georgia, Statoids.com

Municipalities of Guria